IEEE 802.11b-1999 or 802.11b is an amendment to the IEEE 802.11 wireless networking specification that extends throughout up to 11 Mbit/s using the same 2.4 GHz band. A related amendment was incorporated into the IEEE 802.11-2007 standard.

802.11 is a set of IEEE standards that govern wireless networking transmission methods. They are commonly used today in their 802.11a, 802.11b, 802.11g, 802.11n, 802.11ac and 802.11ax versions to provide wireless connectivity in the home, office and some commercial establishments.

Description 
802.11b has a maximum raw data rate of 11 Mbit/s and uses the same CSMA/CA media access method defined in the original standard. Due to the CSMA/CA protocol overhead, in practice the maximum 802.11b throughput that an application can achieve is about 5.9 Mbit/s using TCP and 7.1 Mbit/s using UDP.

802.11b products appeared on the market in mid-1999, since 802.11b is a direct extension of the DSSS (Direct-sequence spread spectrum) modulation technique defined in the original standard. The Apple iBook was the first mainstream computer sold with optional 802.11b networking. Technically, the 802.11b standard uses complementary code keying (CCK) as its modulation technique, which uses a specific set of length 8 complementary codes that was originally designed for OFDM  but was also suitable for use in 802.11b because of its low autocorrelation properties. The dramatic increase in throughput of 802.11b (compared to the original standard) along with simultaneous substantial price reductions led to the rapid acceptance of 802.11b as the definitive wireless LAN technology as well as to the formation of the Wi-Fi Alliance.

802.11b devices suffer interference from other products operating in the 2.4 GHz band. Devices operating in the 2.4 GHz range include: microwave ovens, Bluetooth devices, baby monitors and cordless telephones. Interference issues and user density problems within the 2.4 GHz band have become a major concern and frustration for users.

Range 
802.11b is used in a point-to-multipoint configuration, wherein an access point communicates via an omnidirectional antenna with mobile clients within the range of the access point.  Typical range depends on the radio frequency environment, output power and sensitivity of the receiver.  Allowable bandwidth is shared across clients in discrete channels.  A directional antenna focuses transmit and receive power into a smaller field which reduces interference and increases point-to-point range.  Designers of such installations who wish to remain within the law must however be careful about legal limitations on effective radiated power.

Some 802.11b cards operate at 11 Mbit/s, but scale back to 5.5, then to 2, then to 1 Mbit/s (also known as Adaptive Rate Selection) in order to decrease the rate of re-broadcasts that result from errors.

Channels and frequencies

Note: Channel 14 is only allowed in Japan, Channels 12 & 13 are allowed in most parts of the world. More information can be found in the List of WLAN channels.

Comparison

See also
 IEEE 802.11
 IEEE 802.11g-2003
 Wi-Fi
 List of WLAN channels

References

 
 

B

ja:IEEE 802.11#IEEE 802.11b